The Hunter 376 is an American sailboat that was designed by the Hunter Design Team as a cruiser and first built in 1996.

The Hunter 376 shares a common hull with the Hunter 386 and the Hunter 380.

Production
The design was built by Hunter Marine in the United States between 1996 and 1998.

Design
The Hunter 376 is a recreational keelboat, built predominantly of fiberglass. It has a fractional sloop B&R rig, a raked stem, a walk-through reverse transom, an internally mounted spade-type rudder controlled by a wheel and a fixed wing keel or fin keel. It displaces  and carries  of lead ballast.

Factory standard equipment included a 110% roller furling genoa, four two-speed self tailing winches, anodized spars, marine VHF radio, knotmeter, depth sounder, AM/FM radio and CD player with four speakers, dual anchor rollers, hot and cold water cockpit shower, integral solar panel, indirect cabin lighting, teak and holly cabin sole, fully enclosed head with shower, private forward and aft cabins, a dinette table that converts to a berth, complete set of kitchen dishes, microwave oven, dual sinks, three-burner gimbaled liquid petroleum gas stove and oven and life jackets. Factory options included a deep draft keel, a double aft cabin, air conditioning, electric anchor winch and leather cushions.

The design has a PHRF racing average handicap of 150 with a high of 165 and low of 129.

See also
List of sailing boat types

Related development
Hunter 380
Hunter 386

Similar sailboats
Catalina 375
Eagle 38
Hunter 37
Hunter 37 Legend
Hunter 37.5 Legend

References

External links
Official brochure

Keelboats
1990s sailboat type designs
Sailing yachts
Sailboat type designs by Hunter Design Team
Sailboat types built by Hunter Marine